Denmark competed at the 1912 Summer Olympics in Stockholm, Sweden. 152 competitors, 151 men and 1 woman, took part in 46 events in 13 sports.

Medalists

Gold
 Ejler Allert, Christian Hansen, Carl Møller, Carl Pedersen and Poul Hartmann — Rowing, Men's coxed fours, inriggers

Silver
 Ivan Joseph Martin Osiier — Fencing, Men's Épée
 Men's Team — Football
 Men's Team (Swedish system) — Gymnastics
 Steen Herschend, Sven Thomsen and Hans Meulengracht-Madsen — Sailing, Men's 6m class
 Lars Madsen — Shooting, Men's 300m free rifle, three positions
 Sofie Castenschiold — Tennis, Women's singles indoor

Bronze
 Men's Team, free system — Gymnastics
 Erik Bisgaard, Rasmus Frandsen, Mikael Simonsen, Poul Thymann and Ejgil Clemmensen — Rowing, Men's coxed fours
 Niels Larsen — Shooting, Men's 300m free rifle, three positions
 Ole Olsen, Lars Madsen, Niels Larsen, Niels Andersen, Laurits Larsen and Jens Hajslund — Shooting, Men's Team free rifle
 Søren Jensen — Wrestling, Greco-Roman heavyweight

Athletics

14 athletes represented Denmark. It was the fourth appearance of the nation in athletics, which Denmark had competed in each time the nation appeared at the Olympics. Aage Rasmussen's fourth-place finish in the racewalk was Denmark's best athletics result in 1912.

Ranks given are within that athlete's heat for running events.

Cycling

Eight cyclists represented Denmark. It was the first appearance of the nation in cycling. Olaf Meyland-Smith had the best time in the time trial, the only race held, placing 25th. The top four Danish cyclists had a combined time that placed them 8th of the 15 teams.

Road cycling

Equestrian

 Dressage

 Eventing
(The maximum score in each of the five events was 10.00 points. Ranks given are for the cumulative score after each event. Team score is the sum of the top three individual scores.)

Fencing

Six fencers represented Denmark. It was the fourth appearance of the nation in fencing, in which Denmark had competed each time the nation appeared at the Olympics. Ivan Osiier was the only Danish fencer to advance to the final in an event, eventually capturing the silver medal in the épée. His second-place finish was the best in Danish Olympic fencing history at the time, as no Danish fencer had gotten to a final since Holger Nielsen won the bronze in the 1896 sabre competition.

Football

Quarterfinals

Semifinals

Final

Final rank

Gymnastics

Forty-nine gymnasts represented Denmark. It was the third appearance of the nation in gymnastics. Denmark had a team compete in two of the three team competitions. The Danish teams won the nation's first gymnastics medals, placing third of five in the free system and second of three in the Swedish system. Six Danish gymnasts competed in the individual competition, with Arvor Hansen's 26th-place finish the best of the six.

Artistic

Modern pentathlon 

Denmark had four competitors in the first Olympic pentathlon competition. The Danish pentathletes had little success, with three of them not finishing and the fourth coming in last among the finishers, nearly 30 points behind the next nearest competitor.

(The scoring system was point-for-place in each of the five events, with the smallest point total winning.)

Rowing 

Fifteen rowers represented Denmark. It was the nation's first appearance in rowing. Denmark's debut was successful, especially in the coxed fours events, with the team winning a gold medal in the inriggers competition and a bronze in the outriggers.

(Ranks given are within each crew's heat.)

Sailing 

Three sailors represented Denmark. It was the nation's first appearance in sailing. Denmark sent only one boat, which took the silver medal in the six metre class.

(7 points for 1st in each race, 3 points for 2nd, 1 point for 3rd. Race-off to break ties in total points if necessary.)

Shooting 

Fourteen shooters represented Denmark. It was the nation's fourth appearance in shooting, in which Denmark had competed each time the nation appeared at the Olympics. Madsen and Niels Larsen took second and third, respectively, in the 300 metre free rifle from three positions to take the nation's only individual shooting medals in 1912; both were also on the six-man team which earned a bronze medal in the team rifle competition. They were the first medals won by Denmark in shooting since 1900.

Swimming

One swimmer competed for Denmark at the 1912 Games. It was the third time the nation had competed in swimming. Hedegaard was unable to advance out of the first round in either of his two events.

Ranks given for each swimmer are within the heat.

 Men

Tennis 

Ten tennis players, including one woman, represented Denmark at the 1912 Games. It was the nation's debut appearance in tennis. The lone Danish woman was also the lone Danish medalist, taking the silver medal in the indoor singles. She, along with Larsen, advanced to the quarterfinals in the indoor mixed doubles event as well. None of the other players advanced past the round of 16.

 Men

 Women

 Mixed

Wrestling

Greco-Roman

Denmark sent nine wrestlers in 1912. It was the nation's second Olympic wrestling appearance.

Two of the three Danish bronze medalists returned in 1912. Andersen, the middleweight, was not as successful as four years earlier; he lost his first two matches to be eliminated at 26th place. Jensen, on the other hand, matched his prior bronze with another. He won his first three matches before taking his first loss to Saarela. In a loser-out fifth round match against Backenius, Jensen won and advanced to the medal round. There, he again faced Saarela; a second loss to the Finn put Jensen in a match against Olin. The winner of this match would face Saarela in the final while the loser would take the bronze medal. Olin turned out to be too much for Jensen, who finished the tournament with the bronze.

Four other Danes advanced to the fifth round before receiving their second loss and elimination. The team overall went 15-17 in the elimination rounds and 0-2 in the medal round.

References

External links
Official Olympic Reports
International Olympic Committee results database

Nations at the 1912 Summer Olympics
1912
Olympics